Nicolás Mentxaka Beitia (born 23 August 1909) was a Spanish professional footballer who played as a forward.

Early and personal life
Mentxaka was born in Getxo. His sons Nicolás and José Luis were also footballers.

Career
Mentxaka played for Arenas and Valencia.

References

1909 births
Year of death missing
Spanish footballers
Association football forwards
Arenas Club de Getxo footballers
Valencia CF players
La Liga players
Footballers from Getxo